Nizhnyaya Tyulma (Tübänge Tölmäy) is a rural locality (a village) in Inzersky Selsoviet, Beloretsky District, Bashkortostan, Russia. The population was 65 as of 2010. There are 2 streets.

Geography 
Nizhnyaya Tyulma is located 100 km northwest of Beloretsk (the district's administrative centre) by road. Alexandrovka is the nearest rural locality.

References 

Rural localities in Beloretsky District